Griffith Rhys Jones  (born 16 November 1953) is a Welsh comedian, writer, actor, and television presenter. He starred in a number of television series with his comedy partner, Mel Smith. Rhys Jones came to national attention in the 1980s for his work in the BBC television comedy sketch shows Not the Nine O'Clock News and Alas Smith and Jones. 

From 2008 to 2016, he presented the television bloopers show It'll be Alright on the Night for ITV, having replaced Denis Norden, and being succeeded in 2018 by David Walliams.

Early life and education
Griffith Rhys Jones was born on 16 November 1953 in Cardiff, the son of Gwynneth Margaret (née Jones) and Elwyn Rhys Jones, a medical doctor. His family moved due to his father's occupation to West Sussex when Rhys Jones was six months old. Rhys Jones attended Conifers Primary School in Midhurst, West Sussex, before his family moved to Brentwood, Essex. He attended a junior school in Epping, Essex, and the Brentwood School, also in Essex.

After a short spell working as a petrol pump attendant, Rhys Jones gained a gap year job on the P&O ship Uganda, working for a company organising school trips. In his autobiography, Semi-Detached, he describes how he was charged with helping to look after 600 Canadian schoolgirls, followed by a similar number of younger Scottish schoolchildren, and refers to the experience as being like "St Trinians at sea". He wrote to eight of the Canadians afterwards.

Rhys Jones initially read History, later changing to English, at Emmanuel College, Cambridge, graduating with a 2:1.

Career
After Cambridge, Rhys Jones then joined BBC Radio Light Entertainment as a trainee producer, with his responsibilities including the satirical show Week Ending and Brain of Britain. He also appeared in 1974 in the Comedy series Oh no it isn't ! on BBC Radio 4.

Rhys Jones came in as a producer of Rowan Atkinson's show The Atkinson People with Frankie Howerd, Clive Anderson and Rory McGrath, for the BBC and appeared twice on Whose Line Is It Anyway?

Rhys Jones filled in several minor roles in the first series of Not the Nine O'Clock News, and was brought in as a regular cast member from the second series onwards, replacing Chris Langham. Rhys Jones says that the reason he got the part was not due to his appearance in the initial shows, or his talent, but because producer John Lloyd was dating his sister at the time. Rhys Jones became a regular from the commissioned second series.

Rhys Jones was awarded the Laurence Olivier Theatre Award in 1984 for Best Comedy Performance in Charley's Aunt  and in 1994 for Best Comedy Performance for his performance in An Absolute Turkey.  He also played Toad in The Wind in the Willows at the National Theatre in 1990, as well as a number of other theatre roles. He provided the voices on the series of short cartoons Funnybones.

Rhys Jones has continued his acting career, being cast in Casualty and Agatha Christie's Marple as well as starring in Russell T Davies' drama series Mine All Mine on ITV. It'll be Alright on the Night returned with Rhys Jones as the new presenter, taking over from Denis Norden. The first programme with Rhys Jones as host aired in 2008.

In January 2012, Rhys Jones returned to BBC sketch comedy The Ones alongside the likes of Hugh Bonneville, Tom Hollander and Larry Lamb, for one of a three episode series in which comedy legends take to the stage for a mix of stand-up and sketches.

Partnership with Mel Smith
After Not the Nine O'Clock News, Mel Smith and Rhys Jones teamed up in 1984, and appeared in the comedy sketch series Alas Smith and Jones. (the show's title being a pun on the American television series Alias Smith and Jones). After the first series, the two men appeared on the in Mike Hodges' science fiction comedy movie Morons from Outer Space. and then in 1989, the London Weekend Television production Wilt. Dressed as bobbies, in July 1985 Smith and Rhys Jones introduced Queen on stage at Live Aid.

Smith and Rhys Jones were reunited in March 2005, for a Comic Relief sketch,. which led to a revival of their previous television series in The Smith and Jones Sketchbook. Their final television appearance together was a Head To Head routine for the special of 2012 The One Griff Rhys-Jones.

With Smith, he co-founded the television production company Talkback Productions, now part of RTL Group and later in 2005, he established the production company Modern Television. When Smith died in the summer of 2013, Rhys Jones wrote a piece about his comedy partner in the Radio Times, saying it was "sheer bliss" to perform with Smith.

Production companies
In 1981, Rhys Jones along with Mel Smith founded Talkback, a production company which produced many British comedy series, including Smack the Pony, Da Ali G Show, I'm Alan Partridge, They Think It's All Over, QI and Big Train. 

In 2005, Rhys Jones created his own production company Modern Television, which has since made a number of productions with Rhys Jones as presenter and executive producer. 

In May 2014, Rhys Jones was executive producer on his production company's debut BBC drama A Poet in New York starring Tom Hollander as Dylan Thomas.

Documentaries
Rhys Jones has developed a career as a television presenter, beginning as the co-host on several Comic Relief programmes. He presented Bookworm from 1994 to 2000, was the presenter of the BBC's Restoration programme and has undertaken fundraising work for the Hackney Empire theatre conservation project.

Since 2006, Rhys Jones has appeared in the BBC's Three Men in a Boat series, alongside Dara Ó Briain and Rory McGrath. The series has included the trio rowing the River Thames, as in the 1889 novel, sailing from London to the Isle of Wight for a sailing boat race, borrowing numerous vessels to make their way from Plymouth to the Isles of Scilly.

In later adventures, the three men took to the Irish Canals and Rivers on a trip from Dublin to Limerick (Dara's Greyhound Snip Nua also tagged along for the trip), went to Scotland, and sailed along the Balkan coast ending up in Venice for a gondola race. His documentary series Mountain, for which he climbed 15 British peaks during 2006, was broadcast on BBC One 29 July–26 August 2007. Rhys Jones visited his mother's home town in Ferndale, Rhondda Cynon Taff for an episode of the BBC One series Who Do You Think You Are?, broadcast on 20 September 2007. In the episode, he detailed early memories and stories of his grandparents' fruit and vegetable shop on the high street and his mother's childhood concert performances at Trerhondda Chapel. He presented a documentary series with 5 episodes A Pembrokeshire Farm which was broadcast on BBC4 in July/August 2007. Two years later he presented another 5 episode documentary series Return to a Pembrokeshire Farm which was broadcast on BBC4 in September/ October 2009. Both series concerned the renovation of a farm in Pembrokeshire which Rhys Jones had purchased with a view to restoring them.

He presented a seasonal documentary, Charles Dickens and the Invention of Christmas, which was broadcast on 23 December 2007 on BBC One. Rhys Jones fronted Greatest Cities of the World, which saw him visiting a different city each week. The first series, featuring London, New York City and Paris, aired on primetime ITV in October 2008. A second series featuring Rome, Sydney and Hong Kong was broadcast in April and May 2010.
Rhys Jones has created and presented programmes about Arthur Ransome, Thomas Hardy, John Betjeman and Rudyard Kipling.

During July to August 2009, Rhys Jones presented the BBC programme Rivers with Griff Rhys Jones. which featured on the cover of Radio Times.

In 2010, Rhys Jones presented a programme called The Prince's Welsh Village that featured Prince Charles.

In 2011, he presented the series Hidden Treasures of Art, which examined the art of Australia, India and Africa over the course of three episodes. Britain's Lost Routes with Griff Rhys Jones was broadcast on BBC One from 30 May to 20 June 2012. The show looked at lesser known routes around Great Britain. On 29 April 2012, Rhys Jones guest presented an episode of Perspectives on ITV, his chosen subject being Wind in the Willows.

In 2013, Rhys Jones presented a documentary about his father's service as a medical officer with the Gold Coast Regiment and the war in Burma, Burma, My Father and the Forgotten Army, was broadcast on BBC Two on 7 July.

In 2014, Rhys Jones fronted an eight-part ITV documentary series entitled A Great Welsh Adventure with Griff Rhys Jones.

From 10 April 2015, he introduced a five-part documentary series for ITV, Slow Train Through Africa, taking in life on and off trains from Morocco to South Africa, by way of Algeria, Tunisia, Kenya and Tanzania, Zambia, Zimbabwe and Namibia.

In December 2015, it was announced that Rhys Jones would present Griff's Great Britain, a new eight-part series for ITV. 

In August 2022, Rhys Jones presented Griff's Canadian Adventure a new 6 part series for Channel 4, where he travelled across Canada from Newfoundland to British Columbia.

Writing
Rhys Jones has written or co-written many of the programmes he has appeared in, and many spin-off books. In 2002, he began writing a book called To the Baltic with Bob, describing his adventures on the high seas with his sailing friend Bob, as they make their way to Saint Petersburg, port by port.The book was published in 2003, with Rhys Jones saying of the experience: "As a child you go out and play and you lose all track of time and space. It's harder and harder to attain that blissful state of absorption as you get older. I did a six-month sailing trip to St Petersburg with some mates just to get it back."

His early life has been captured in his autobiography, Semi-Detached, published in 2006 by Penguin Books. His book to accompany the BBC One series Mountain was published in July 2007.

Other work
During 1999 to 2001, Rhys Jones featured in television adverts for the Vauxhall range of cars, as a "boffin". In April 2001, he was dismissed by Vauxhall, after an embarrassing advert for the Vauxhall VX220. He officially signed the deal in May 1999.

Rhys Jones provided the voice over for Brentwood School's 450th anniversary DVD, reading a script written by fellow Old Brentwoodian Jonathan Ruffle.

Rhys Jones became President of The Victorian Society in February 2018, in succession to Asa Briggs, following a period as vice president from 2009, and has participated in media campaigns for the society. Since 2007, he has been a Vice-President of the River Stour Trust, a registered charity led by volunteers who are dedicated to the restoration and conservation of the River Stour Navigation for the benefit and enjoyment of the public.

In June 2008, it was announced that Rhys Jones was to become the President of Civic Voice, the nationwide charity that campaigns for better places in the built and green environment.

In August 2014, Rhys Jones was one of 200 public figures who were signatories to a letter to The Guardian expressing their hope that Scotland would vote to remain part of the United Kingdom in September's referendum on that issue.

Personal life
Rhys Jones met his wife, Jo, a graphic designer, while working at the BBC. He has described their first meeting by saying: "The day we met, I was semi naked and she was throwing water over me." The couple have two children, and live between homes in London (previously in Islington, now in a Grade I listed house in London's Fitzrovia in the West End) and Holbrook in Suffolk.

Around 2011, he bought a 1948  wooden yacht, Argyll, which he races at regattas, including the Fastnet Race. He and Jo are keen gardeners, and he discussed their extensive garden in an October 2015 episode of Gardeners' World, part of which was filmed there.

A former heavy drinker, Rhys Jones is a teetotaller: "I don't drink so going to a party can become very tedious. By about 11 o'clock, everybody goes to another planet and you're not there with them, so I tend to avoid that sort of thing." He started running as a leisure pursuit in his early forties. In 2008, he presented two programmes called Losing It which were shown on BBC Two, in which he discussed his own problems with anger management.

An active conservationist, Rhys Jones is the president of Civic Voice, the national organisation representing Britain's civic societies. He also owns a small pack of alpacas.

A resident of East Anglia, Rhys Jones was awarded an honorary degree by the University of East Anglia in 2002.

He was awarded honorary degrees by the University of Glamorgan, the University of Essex and an honorary D.Litt from Anglia Ruskin University. He is also a Fellow of the Royal Welsh College of Music and Drama, the Royal Society of Arts, and an Honorary Fellow of his alma mater, Emmanuel College, Cambridge. In 2009 he was honoured by his father's former university, the University of Wales College of Medicine (now part of Cardiff University).

Rhys Jones was appointed Officer of the Order of the British Empire (OBE) in the 2019 Birthday Honours for services to the National Civic Society Movement, charity and entertainment.

Filmography

References

External links

Griff Rhys Jones – Official website

1953 births
Alumni of Emmanuel College, Cambridge
BBC radio producers
Welsh comedy writers
Welsh male film actors
Welsh male television actors
Welsh television presenters
Welsh television writers
Living people
People educated at Brentwood School, Essex
People from Babergh District
Mass media people from Cardiff
Welsh male comedians
Laurence Olivier Award winners
British male television writers
Officers of the Order of the British Empire